Colachi is a stratovolcano in the Antofagasta Region of northern Chile. It was built on a basement of ignimbrites. A 7 km² silicic lava flow lies on the saddle between the volcano and Acamarachi.

Colachi is part of a chain of stratovolcanoes stretching along the eastern side of the Salar de Atacama, the most active of which being Lascar.

See also
 List of volcanoes in Chile
 Laguna Verde (volcano)
 Purico Complex

References 

Mountains of Chile
Stratovolcanoes of Chile
Volcanoes of Antofagasta Region